Vengeance (報仇; original Hong Kong title, Bao chou) is a 1970 kung fu film directed by Chang Cheh, and starring David Chiang and Ti Lung. The film is set in Peking in 1925, and centers on a revenge plight of Chiang. The movie has little actual kung fu and instead is heavily laden with knife fighting and judo.

At the 16th Asian Film Festival, Director Chang Cheh won the Best Director Award, David Chiang won the Best Actor Award and received Asia's first Movie King Award, and Vengeance went on to win the Best Movie Award and the Iron Triangle.

References

External links
 

1970 films
1970 action films
1970 martial arts films
Hong Kong martial arts films
Films directed by Chang Cheh
Films set in Beijing
Films set in 1920
Films about Peking opera
1970s Hong Kong films